India national youth football team can refer to the following age group teams:

 India national under-23 football team
 India national under-19 football team
 India national under-16 football team
 India national under-15 football team